This is a list of book distributors, companies that act as distributors for book publishers, selling primarily to the book trade. The list includes defunct and merged/acquired companies, and distributors whose primary business is not books, such as comic books. The companies may provide exclusive distribution rights, or act as a wholesaler or warehouser of publisher's titles. Many of the companies distribute other products, and some also sell directly to the public. Book distributors offer a consolidated list of publisher's titles, such that bookstores can purchase from a wider range of publishers than if they had to open separate accounts with each publisher, who often require a minimum order that the bookstore cannot meet. Most small or independent publishers have relationships with a distributor, including self-published authors, who often use services like Amazon.com to sell to the public. The large publishing companies, including the "Big Five" (Penguin Random House, Hachette, Macmillan, HarperCollins and Simon & Schuster), act as distributors for the numerous imprints they have acquired over the years.

United States
AK Press
Alibris
Anchor Distributors
Amazon.com, not strictly a distributor to the trade, but acts as a de facto distributor for many self-published authors and small presses
Baker & Taylor (portions of Baker & Taylor were acquired by Readerlink Distribution Services in February 2015) (sold to book distributor Follett in April 2016,  ending B&T's status as an independent and forcing change in B&T's management) 
Barnes & Noble
 Blackstone Audio
Casemate
Children's Plus Inc. (Children's & Teen Specialist)
Continental Sales Inc. [https://www.continentalsalesinc.com/}
Diamond Comic Distributors (comics)
Capital City Distribution (comics, acquired by Diamond)
New Media/Irjax (acquired by Diamond)
D.A.P./Distributed Art Publishers
Follett Corporation
Greenleaf Book Group, distributor and hybrid publisher
Heroes World Distribution, owned by Marvel Comics
Independent Publishers Group, owned by Chicago Review Press
Ingram Content Group
Publishers Group West
Two Rivers (formerly Perseus Distribution)
Last Gasp
Midpoint Trade Books
Perseus Books Group
Readerlink Distribution Services (largest book distributor to mass merchandisers in United States) 
Rowman & Littlefield
Send the Light
Small Press Distribution
Smashwords, global ebook distribution
TAN Books
Texas Bookman
Tuttle Publishing
University of Chicago Press, distribution (warehousing, fulfillment, and marketing) for many university presses and small non-profit publishers.

Canada 

 Fitzhenry & Whiteside
 Raincoast Books
 Thomas Allen & Son
 University of British Columbia Press 
 University of Toronto Press

Asia
Booktopia, Australia
Flipkart, India
Diamond Comics, India
India Book House, India
Reformers Bookshop, Australia
Dangdang, China
JD.com, China
 Jarir Bookstore, Saudi Arabia

Europe 

 Baker & Taylor, United Kingdom
 Bertrams, United Kingdom
 Gardners Books, United Kingdom
 Logista, Spain

See also
List of online booksellers 
Lists of publishing companies

References

Distributors
Book